BP-897 is a drug used in scientific research which acts as a potent selective dopamine D3 receptor partial agonist with an in vitro intrinsic activity of ~0.6 and ~70x greater affinity for D3 over D2 receptors and is suspected to have partial agonist or antagonist activity in vivo. It has mainly been used in the study of treatments for cocaine addiction. A study comparing BP-897 with the potent, antagonistic, and highly D3 selective SB-277,011-A found, "SB 277011-A (1–10 mg/kg) was able to block cue-induced reinstatement of nicotine-seeking, indicating that DRD3 selective antagonism may be an effective approach to prevent relapse for nicotine. In contrast, BP 897 did not block the cue-induced reinstatement of nicotine-seeking or nicotine-taking under the FR5 schedule."

References 

Dopamine agonists
2-Naphthyl compounds
Carboxamides
Phenylpiperazines
Phenol ethers
Experimental drugs